Jared Brownridge (born November 13, 1994) is an American professional basketball player for the Delaware Blue Coats of the NBA G League. He played college basketball for Santa Clara University.

College career
As a junior, Brownridge posted 20.6 points per game to lead the West Coast Conference in scoring. Brownridge averaged 18.1 points, 2.7 rebounds, and 2.8 assists per game as a senior at Santa Clara. He finished as the second-leading scorer at Santa Clara with 2,313 points and was a three-time All-Conference selection.

Professional career

Pallacanestro Mantovana (2017)
He signed with Italian team Pallacanestro Mantovana in July 2017.

Delaware 87ers / Blue Coats (2018–present)
Brownridge signed with the Delaware 87ers in March 2018. During the 2018-19 season, he averaged 15.9 points per game. Brownridge averaged 15.3 points per game in the 2019-20 season, shooting 38.5 percent from three-point range, before the season was shut down due to the COVID-19 pandemic. On October 14, 2021, he was signed and subsequently waived by the Philadelphia 76ers. On December 26, 2022, Brownridge was reacquired by the Delaware Blue Coats.

Personal life
In March 2020, Brownridge created the online podcast  J.B. & Co.

References

External links
Santa Clara Broncos bio
College stats @ sports-reference.com

1994 births
Living people
American expatriate basketball people in Italy
American men's basketball players
Basketball players from Illinois
Delaware 87ers players
Delaware Blue Coats players
Pallacanestro Mantovana players
Santa Clara Broncos men's basketball players
Shooting guards
Sportspeople from Aurora, Illinois